Henry Wellesley may refer to:
 Henry Wellesley, 1st Baron Cowley (1773–1847), diplomat, brother of the 1st Duke of Wellington
 Henry Wellesley (1794–1866), scholar, youngest child of Richard Wellesley, 1st Marquess Wellesley, a nephew of the 1st Duke of Wellington
 Henry Wellesley, 3rd Duke of Wellington (1846–1900), politician
 Henry Wellesley, 1st Earl Cowley (1804–1884), British diplomat
 Henry Wellesley, 6th Duke of Wellington (1912–1943), British peer and politician
 Henry Wellesley (1804 ship), a barque that made three whaling voyages and two voyages carrying convicts to Australia before she was wrecked in 1841.

Wellesley, Henry